Jesse Burris (January 22, 1982) is an American attorney and politician who served as a member of the Kansas House of Representatives from the 82nd district. He was appointed to the House on May 31, 2017, succeeding his father-in-law, Peter DeGraaf. In 2022, Burris declined to run for re-election, and his term ended at the beginning of the legislative session on January 9, 2023. He was succeeded by Leah Howell.

Education 
Burris earned a Bachelor of Science degree in political science and business administration from Washburn University and a Juris Doctor from the Washburn University School of Law.

Career 
After graduating from law school, Burris worked as an attorney for the Secretary of State of Kansas and Kansas Department of Health and Environment. Burris was nominated to the Kansas House of Representatives and assumed office on May 31, 2017, succeeding his father-in-law, Peter DeGraaf. Burris also served in the United States Air Force.

Personal life 
Burris and his wife, Anneke, live in Mulvane, Kansas and have three children.

References 

Living people
Republican Party members of the Kansas House of Representatives
Washburn University alumni
Washburn University School of Law alumni
Kansas lawyers
1982 births
21st-century American politicians